Toufik Benedictus "Benny" Hinn (born 3 December 1952) is an Israeli Christian televangelist, best known for his regular "Miracle Crusades"—revival meeting or faith healing summits that are usually held in stadiums in major cities, which are later broadcast worldwide on his television program, This Is Your Day.

Biography
Hinn was born in Jaffa, in 1952, in the then newly established state of Israel to parents born in Palestine with Greek-Egyptian, Palestinian and Armenian-Lebanese heritage. He was raised within the Eastern Orthodox tradition and baptized by the patriarch of Jerusalem.

Soon after the 1967 Arab–Israeli War ("The Six-Day War"), Hinn's family emigrated to Toronto, Ontario, Canada, in 1968 where he attended Georges Vanier Secondary School. He did not graduate. In his books, Hinn states that his father was the mayor of Jaffa at the time of his birth and that he was socially isolated as a child and had a stutter, but that he was nonetheless a first-class student. 

In 1972, he became a born-again Christian. Hinn has written that on 21 December 1973, he traveled by charter bus from Toronto to Pittsburgh to attend a "miracle service" conducted by evangelist Kathryn Kuhlman. Although he never met her personally, he often attended her "healing services" and has often cited her as an influence in his life. In 1974 he was invited to speak about his spiritual experience at Trinity Pentecostal Church in Oshawa and claimed to have been cured of his stuttering.

Ministry 
On moving to the United States, Hinn traveled to Orlando, Florida, where he founded the Orlando Christian Center in 1983. Eventually, he began claiming that God was using him as a conduit for healings, and began holding healing services in his church. These new "Miracle Crusades" were soon held at large stadiums and auditoriums across the United States and the world, the first nationally televised service being held in Flint, Michigan, in 1989. In 1990, he also launched a new daily talk show called This Is Your Day, which to this day airs clips of supposed miracles from Hinn's Miracle Crusades. The program premiered on the Trinity Broadcasting Network of Paul Crouch, who would become one of Hinn's most outspoken defenders and allies. Hinn's ministry began to rapidly grow from there, winning praise as well as criticism from fellow Christian leaders. In 1999, he stepped down as pastor of the Orlando Christian Center, moving his ministry's administrative headquarters to Grapevine, Texas, a suburb of Fort Worth, while hosting This Is Your Day from a television studio in Orange County, California, where he now lives with his family. His former church was renamed Faith World Church under the leadership of Clint Brown, who merged his Orlando church with Hinn's.

Benny Hinn is the author of a number of Christian books. His thirty-minute TV program This Is Your Day is among the world's most-watched Christian programs, seen on various Christian television networks, including Trinity Broadcasting Network, Daystar Television Network, Revelation TV, Grace TV, Vision TV, INSP Networks, and The God Channel.

Hinn conducts regular "Miracle Crusades"—revival meeting / faith healing events held in sports stadiums in major cities throughout the world. Tens of millions attend his Holy Spirit Miracle Crusades each year. Hinn claims to have spoken to one billion people through his crusades, including memorable crusades with attendance of 7.3 million people (in three services) in India, the largest healing service in recorded history. Evander Holyfield, who was diagnosed with a non-compliant left ventricle, has credited his healing to Benny Hinn, stating that through God working through Hinn, he was healed as he had "a warm feeling" go through his chest as Hinn touched him.

Beliefs 
Hinn's teachings are charismatic, accepting the validity of spiritual gifts, and Word of Faith in origin, with a focus on financial prosperity. Some doctrine and practices that Hinn teaches are rejected in mainstream Christianity.

Missions 
Benny Hinn Ministries claims to support 60 mission organizations across the world and several orphanages around the world, and claims to house and feed over 100,000 children a year and support 45,000 children daily because of his donors.

Benny Hinn Ministries donated $100,000 for relief supplies for Hurricane Katrina victims in 2005, and $250,000 to the tsunami relief effort in 2007.

Criticism and controversy
Some media have questioned the fact that Hinn has a stutter. 

In March 1993 Inside Edition reported on Hinn's $685,000 Orlando home and Mercedes-Benz, despite Hinn having previously claimed a "modest lifestyle". An employee of Inside Edition also faked a healing from cerebral palsy which was shown on Hinn's regular broadcast.

A controversial aspect of Hinn's ministry is his teaching on, and demonstration of, a phenomenon he dubs "The Anointing"—the power purportedly given by God and transmitted through Hinn to carry out supernatural acts. At his Miracle Crusades, he has allegedly healed attendees of blindness, deafness, cancer, AIDS, and severe physical injuries. However, investigative reports by the Los Angeles Times, NBC's Dateline, the CBC's The Fifth Estate, and the Nine Network's 60 Minutes have called these claims into question.

Hinn has also caused controversy for theological remarks and claims he has made during TV appearances. In 1999, Hinn appeared on the Trinity Broadcasting Network, claiming that God had given him a vision predicting the resurrection of thousands of dead people after watching the network—laying out a scenario of people placing their dead loved ones' hands on TV screens tuned into the station—and suggesting that TBN would be "an extension of Heaven to Earth."

A Question of Miracles

In April 2001, HBO aired a documentary entitled A Question of Miracles that focused on Hinn and a well-documented fellow Word-of-Faith German minister based in Africa, Reinhard Bonnke. Both Hinn and Bonnke offered full access to their events to the documentary crew, and the documentary team followed seven cases of "miracle healings" from Hinn's crusade over the next year. The film's director, Antony Thomas, told CNN's Kyra Phillips that they did not find any cases where people were actually healed by Hinn. Thomas said in a New York Times interview that "If I had seen miracles [from Hinn's ministry], I would have been happy to trumpet it... but in retrospect, I think they do more damage to Christianity than the most committed atheist."

"Do You Believe in Miracles"

In November 2004, the CBC Television show The Fifth Estate did a special titled "Do You Believe in Miracles" on the apparent transgressions committed by Benny Hinn's ministry.

With the aid of hidden cameras and crusade witnesses, the producers of the show demonstrated Hinn's apparent misappropriation of funds, his fabrication of the truth, and the way in which his staff chose crusade audience members to come on stage to proclaim their miracle healings. In particular, the investigation highlighted the fact that the most desperate miracle seekers who attend a Hinn crusade—the quadriplegics, the brain-damaged, virtually anyone with a visibly obvious physical condition—are never allowed up on stage; those who attempt to get in the line of possible healings are intercepted and directed to return to their seats.

At one Canadian service, hidden cameras showed a mother who was carrying her muscular dystrophy-afflicted daughter, Grace, being stopped by two screeners when they attempted to get into the line for a possible blessing from Hinn. The screeners asked the mother if Grace had been healed, and when the mother replied in the negative, they were told to return to their seats; the pair got out of line, but Grace, wanting "Pastor Benny to pray for [her]," asked her mother to support her as she tried to walk as a show of "her faith in action," according to the mother. After several unsuccessful attempts at walking, the pair left the arena in tears, both mother and daughter visibly upset at being turned aside and crying as they explained to the undercover reporters that all Grace had wanted was for Hinn to pray for her, but the staffers rushed them out of the line when they found out Grace had not been healed. A week later at a service in Toronto, Baptist evangelist Justin Peters, who wrote his Masters in Divinity thesis on Benny Hinn and has attended numerous Hinn crusades since 2000 as part of his research for his thesis and for a seminar he developed about the Word of Faith movement entitled A Call for Discernment, also demonstrated to the hidden cameras that "people who look like me"—Peters has cerebral palsy, walks with arm-crutches, and is obviously and visibly disabled—"are never allowed on stage [...] it's always somebody who has some disability or disease that cannot be readily seen." Like Grace and her mother, Peters was quickly intercepted as he came out of the wheelchair section (there is one at every crusade, situated at the back of the audience, far away from the stage, and never filmed for Hinn's TV show) in an attempt to join the line of those waiting to go onstage, and was told to take a seat.

Ministry Watch issues "Donor Alert"

In March 2005, Ministry Watch issued a Donor Alert against the ministry citing a lack of financial transparency among other possible problems. Benny Hinn Ministries is not a member of the Evangelical Council for Financial Accountability.

Senate investigation

In 2007, United States Senator Chuck Grassley announced an investigation of Hinn's ministry by the United States Senate Committee on Finance. In a letter to BHM, Grassley asked for the ministry to divulge financial information to the Senate Committee on Finance to determine if Hinn made any personal profit from financial donations, and requested that Hinn's ministry make the information available. The investigation also scrutinized five other televangelists: Paula White, Kenneth Copeland, Eddie L. Long, Joyce Meyer, and Creflo Dollar.
In December 2007, Hinn said he would not respond to the inquiry until 2008. The ministry subsequently responded to the inquiry, and Grassley said that "...Benny Hinn [has] engaged in open and honest dialogue with committee staff. They have not only provided responses to every question but, in the spirit of true cooperation, also have provided information over and above what was requested."

The investigation concluded in 2011 with no penalties or findings of wrongdoing. The final report raised questions about personal use of church-owned luxury goods and a lack of financial oversight on the ministries' boards, which are often populated with family and friends of the televangelist. Hinn's group reported to the committee that it complied with tax regulations and had made changes in compensation and governance procedures.

Prosperity theology
In 2017, pastor Costi Hinn, a nephew of Benny Hinn, came forward with a testimony of his time spent in Benny Hinn's ministry, and what made him leave. In the testimony, Costi Hinn described the expensive cars and lavish houses that he and his family members owned, and the luxury that surrounded their travel. Costi Hinn criticized the prosperity gospel and teachings of his uncle, writing among other things that healings only seemed to work on the "crusades", where music created an atmosphere, and that many of their prophecies contradicted the Bible. He has since written a book titled God, Greed, and the (Prosperity) Gospel on the topic. In the book, Costi Hinn calls the prosperity gospel "damning and abusive", exploitative of the poor and vulnerable, and "arguably the most hateful and abusive kind of false teaching plaguing the church today". 

In September 2019, he said that Benny Hinn no longer believed in prosperity theology, and decided to stop teaching it.

Personal life
Hinn married Suzanne Harthern on 4 August 1979. The couple have four children. Suzanne filed divorce papers in California's Orange County Superior Court on 1 February 2010, citing "irreconcilable differences." 

In July 2010, Hinn and fellow televangelist Paula White were photographed leaving a hotel in Rome holding hands. Both Hinn and White denied allegations in the National Enquirer that the two were engaged in an affair. Hinn was sued in February 2011 by the Christian publishing house Strang Communications, which claimed that a relationship with White did occur and that Hinn had violated the morality clause of his contract with the company.

In May 2012, Hinn announced that he and Suzanne had begun reconciliation during the Christmas season of 2011, stating that the split had been caused by her addiction to prescription drugs and antidepressants and citing his busy schedule and lack of time for his wife and children. Benny and Suzanne remarried on 3 March 2013, at the Holy Land Experience theme park, in a traditional ceremony lasting over two hours and attended by approximately 1,000 well-wishers, including many visiting Christian leaders. Jack Hayford referred to the remarriage as "a miracle of God's grace".

Published works

See also 
 Charismatic movement
 Kathryn Kuhlman
 List of television evangelists
 Prosperity Gospel
 Televangelism
 Word of Faith

References

External links

 
 Ministry Watch Report on Benny Hinn
 This is Your Day with Benny Hinn – Daystar Television – Benny Hinn on Daystar Television
 RICHES Podcast Documentaries: Calvary Assembly and Benny Hinn, Part 1
 RICHES Podcast Documentaires: Calvary Assembly and Benny Hinn, Part 2

1952 births
American people of Armenian descent
American people of Egyptian descent
American people of Greek descent
American people of Israeli descent
American people of Palestinian descent
American television evangelists
Arab citizens of Israel
Canadian people of Armenian descent
Canadian people of Egyptian descent
Canadian people of Greek descent
Canadian people of Lebanese descent
Canadian people of Palestinian descent
Canadian television evangelists
Converts to Protestantism from Eastern Orthodoxy
Faith healers
Former Greek Orthodox Christians
Israeli Arab Christians
Israeli emigrants to Canada
Israeli people of Armenian descent
Israeli people of Greek descent
Israeli people of Palestinian descent
Israeli Pentecostals
Living people
People from Jaffa
People from Toronto
Prosperity theologians